Penaherreraus pubicornis is a species of beetle in the family Cerambycidae. It was described by Audinet-Serville in 1835.

References

Acanthoderini
Beetles described in 1835